Bolshesoldatsky District is an administrative and municipal district (raion), one of the twenty-eight in Kursk Oblast, Russia. It is located in the south of the oblast. Its administrative center is the rural locality (a selo) of Bolshoye Soldatskoye. Population:  14,636 (2002 Census);  The population of Bolshoye Soldatskoye accounts for 21.1% of the district's total population.

Geography
Bolshesoldatsky District is located in the south-central region of Kursk Oblast.  The terrain is hilly plain averaging 200 meters above sea level; the district lies on the Orel-Kursk plateau of the Central Russian Upland.   The main river in the district is the Sudzha River, which flows from east to west through the district into the Psel River, a tributary of the Dnieper River to the west.  The Sudzha River is typically frozen from December to March.   The district is 35 km southwest of the city of Kursk, and 490 km southwest of Moscow.  The area measures 40 km (north-south), and 30 km (west-east).  The administrative center is the town of Bolshoye Soldatskoye.

The district is bordered on the north by Kurchatovsky District, on the east by Medvensky District, on the south by Belovsky District, and on the west by Sudzhansky District.

References

Notes

Sources

External links
Bolshesoldatsky District on Google Maps
Bolshesoldatsky District on OpenStreetMap

Districts of Kursk Oblast